Don M. Carlson (born December 30, 1938) is an American educator and politician who served in the Washington House of Representatives from the 49th district from 1993 to 2001 and in the Washington State Senate from the 49th district from 2001 to 2005. Carlson, a Republican, lost his seat to Democrat Craig Pridemore in the 2004 election.

References

1938 births
Living people
Republican Party members of the Washington House of Representatives
Republican Party Washington (state) state senators